Sugat ng Alaala ("Wound of Memory") is a 1995 Tagalog-language novel written by Filipino novelist Lazaro Francisco. The 376-page novel was published in the Philippines by the Ateneo de Manila University Press.

Description
Sugat ng Alaala is a romance and war novel.  The novel was set during World War II.  It portrayed the realities of war, the nationalism of the Filipinos, and the "inhumanity, treachery, and opportunism" committed by the novel's protagonists.

See also
Maganda pa ang Daigdig
Daluyong

References

External links
Sugat ng Alaala by Lazaro Francisco at Google Books

Tagalog-language novels
Political novels
Novels set during World War II
Philippine romance novels
1995 novels
Novels set in the Philippines